The 1963 NCAA University Division Golf Championship was the 25th annual NCAA-sanctioned golf tournament to determine the individual and team national champions of men's collegiate golf in the United States.

This was the first tournament held exclusively for University Division, now Division I, programs. College Division programs, which now comprise Division II and Division III took part in their own championship, held in Springfield, Missouri and won by Southwest Missouri State.

The tournament was held at the Wichita Country Club at the then-Municipal University of Wichita in Wichita, Kansas.

Oklahoma State won the team title, the Cowboys' first NCAA team national title.

Individual results

Individual champion
 R.H. Sikes, Arkansas

Tournament medalist
 R.H. Sikes, Arkansas (139)

Team results

Note: Top 10 only
DC = Defending champions

References

NCAA Men's Golf Championship
Golf in Kansas
NCAA Golf Championship
NCAA Golf Championship
NCAA Golf Championship